The Necuno is a phone-like mobile device from Finland, where it is exclusively manufactured. It seeks to provide a high level security and user privacy by omitting the cellular modem, thus not being able to use the regular mobile phone network, instead offering VOIP via a peer-to-peer encrypted communications platform called Ciphra. However, standard cellular connectivity is planned for later versions. 

The Necuno is mostly open-source, apart from an isolated firmware blob without access to the main memory, used in the Wi-Fi driver for regulatory reasons. The device uses Plasma Mobile by default, but can run a variety of open-source mobile operating systems.
The Necuno has an ethernet port.

See also
 Comparison of open-source mobile phones

References

Mobile Linux
Linux-based devices
Open-source mobile phones
Peer-to-peer computing